Eogystia kaszabi is a moth in the family Cossidae. It was described by Franz Daniel in 1965. It is found in China and Mongolia.

References

Cossinae
Moths described in 1965
Moths of Asia